Mellisurgis was a town of Mygdonia, in ancient Macedonia, situated on the road from Thessalonica to Apollonia of Mygdonia, which occurs in two of the Itineraries (Itin. Anton.; Peut. Tab.), at a distance of 20 M. P. from Thessalonica. By the mid-19th century, it still preserved its ancient name in the usual Romaic form of Melissurgús, and was inhabited by honeymakers, as the word implies.

The site of Mellisurgis is near the modern Melissourgos.

References

Populated places in ancient Macedonia
Geography of ancient Mygdonia
Former populated places in Greece